Stephen King is a New Zealand conservationist.

He is well known for his tree-top protest in what is now the Pureora Forest Park in order to halt native forest logging during campaigning in the 1970s and 1980s. King also is involved in the protection of kauri trees in the Waipoua Forest.

King is also one of the patrons of the New Zealand Trust for Conservation Volunteers.

Stephen King was sentenced to four months' community detention in 2010 for possession of objectionable images, including child pornography.

References

Living people
New Zealand environmentalists
Year of birth missing (living people)